Phenacoccus is a genus of mealybugs in the family Pseudococcidae. There are at least 180 described species in Phenacoccus.

See also
 List of Phenacoccus species

References

External links

 

Articles created by Qbugbot
Sternorrhyncha genera
Pseudococcidae